Daniel Virgil Maisonneuve (born October 22, 1999), known professionally as Sub Urban, is an American singer, producer and songwriter. He became famous for his song "Cradles".

Biography 
Maisonneuve was born on October 22, 1999, in Nyack, New York to a French Canadian father and a Taiwanese mother. While raised in the suburbs of Ridgewood, New Jersey, he began producing music at the age of 15. He was trained in classical piano at the age of 6, but quit after claiming that he was "sick of playing other people's compositions". In the fall of 2016, Maisonneuve dropped out of high school to pursue his musical career, "isolating" himself to work on various demos and songs. The most popular song of his to come out of this period of self-isolation was "Cradles", which skyrocketed in popularity after being shared heavily on video-sharing application TikTok.

Discography

Studio albums

Extended plays

Singles

Music videos

Songwriting credits

Tours

Headlining 
OFF TOUR

Supporting 
OFF TOUR

References 

1999 births
Living people
American male singer-songwriters
American male pop singers
Record producers from New Jersey
Singer-songwriters from New Jersey
Record producers from New York (state)
Singer-songwriters from New York (state)
American TikTokers
American people of French-Canadian descent
American people of Taiwanese descent
American musicians of Taiwanese descent
People from Nyack, New York
People from Ridgewood, New Jersey